The Good Thief may refer to:

 The Good Thief (Christianity), Saint Dismas,  one of two thieves crucified alongside Jesus
 The Good Thief, an album by John Brannen
 The Good Thief (film), a 2002 film directed by Neil Jordan
 The Good Thief (soundtrack), the soundtrack album from the film
 The Good Thief (novel), a 2008 novel by Hannah Tinti
 A Good Thief, a 2002 British television film